ROKS Jeonnam (FF-957) is the sixth ship of the Ulsan-class frigate in the Republic of Korea Navy. She is named after the province, Jeonnam.

Development 

In the early 1990s, the Korean government plan for the construction of next generation coastal ships named Frigate 2000 was scrapped due to the 1997 Asian financial crisis. But the decommissioning of the  destroyers and the aging fleet of Ulsan-class frigates, the plan was revived as the Future Frigate eXperimental, also known as FFX in the early 2000s.

10 ships were launched and commissioned from 1980 to 1993. They have 3 different variants which consists of Flight I, Flight II and Flight III.

Construction and career 
ROKS Jeonnam was launched on 19 April 1988 by Hyundai Heavy Industries and commissioned on 17 June 1988.

She participated in RIMPAC 1992.

She participated in RIMPAC 1998.

She participated in RIMPAC 2000.

Decommissioned	30 December 2022

References

External link

1988 ships
Ulsan-class frigates
Frigates of the Republic of Korea Navy
Ships built by Hyundai Heavy Industries Group